Haute-Marne (English: Upper Marne) is a department in the Grand Est region of Northeastern France. Named after the river Marne, its prefecture is Chaumont. In 2019, it had a population of 172,512.

History
Haute-Marne is one of the original 83 departments created during the French Revolution on March 4, 1790. It was created from parts of the former provinces of Champagne, Burgundy, Lorraine and Franche-Comté.

In March 1814 the departmental prefecture, Chaumont, was the unwitting witness to the end of the First Empire. On 1 March, Prussia, Russia, the United Kingdom and Austria signed an accord forbidding any individual peace deal with Napoleon I, and to fight until his final defeat.

During World War II, Haute-Marne was partitioned under German occupation. The canal which runs from the Marne to the Saône served as a border, dividing the department into east and west. The east was a "reserved zone", intended for the creation of a new German (Ripuarian) state, whereas to the west would be the traditional "occupied zone". Haute-Marne was finally liberated by the Allies, in the form of the division of General Leclerc, between August and September 1944.

Geography
Haute-Marne is part of the region of Grand Est and is surrounded by the departments of Meuse, Vosges, Haute-Saône, Côte-d'Or, Aube, and Marne.

The highest mountain is Haut-du-Sac, in the Langres Plateau, in the southwest of the department, which rises to a height of 516 m (1,693 feet). The lowest points at 117m are found on the plains of Perthois and Der.

The department is named after the river Marne, whose source is near Langres. This river covers 120 kilometres within the department. The department is to the east of the Parisian basin, and is characterised by a concentric sequence of cliff faces  of varying geological origin, oriented northeast–southwest.

Principal towns

The most populous commune is Saint-Dizier; the prefecture Chaumont is the second-most populous. As of 2019, there are 5 communes with more than 3,000 inhabitants:

Demographics 
Population development since 1801:

Tourism
The Haute-Marne department is not a famous department but this peaceful territory has numerous interesting places to visit. Indeed, the department was one of the most powerful in French history thanks to metallurgy economy and was a land of confrontations along history.

Thus, among other examples, the French Wars of Religion (from 1562 to 1598) began with the Massacre of Vassy in the north of the Haute-Marne department. Following this event, open military conflicts across France Kingdom began. The Edict of Nantes is the consequence of this period.

The fortified town of Langres, famous for Denis Diderot author of the Encyclopédie, the Renaissance castle of Joinville, the Lake Der-Chantecoq (one of the biggest artificial lake in Europe), the Chateau de Cirey where Voltaire lived for a while with Émilie du Châtelet and the village of Colombey-les-Deux-Églises where Charles De Gaulle lived until his death are all major attractions.

Haute-Marne is also well known for some famous French great men and women as:
Louise Michel
Camille Flammarion and his brother Ernest Flammarion
Goncourt brothers most famous all around the world with the Prix Goncourt, literature prize given by the académie Goncourt for "the best and most imaginative prose work of the year"
Albin Michel

Politics
Charles de Gaulle was a longtime resident of the department, in Colombey-les-Deux-Églises, and died there on 9 November 1970, at the age of 79.

The president of the Departmental Council is Nicolas Lacroix, elected in 2017.

Presidential elections 2nd round

Current National Assembly Representatives

See also
Arrondissements of the Haute-Marne department
Cantons of the Haute-Marne department
Communes of the Haute-Marne department

References

External links
  Prefecture website
  Departmental Council website

  
  Official Tourist Board website

 
1790 establishments in France
Departments of Grand Est
States and territories established in 1790